The 2012 Kraft Nabisco Championship was played at Mission Hills Country Club in Rancho Mirage, California, from March 29 through April 1. It was the 41st edition of the Kraft Nabisco Championship and its 30th year as a women's major.

On the 72nd hole, I.K. Kim had a  putt to seal her first major title. The putt lipped out, forcing a playoff with Sun-Young Yoo, who also shot 69 in the final round. Yoo won the sudden-death playoff with a birdie on the first extra hole. Yani Tseng, the 2010 champion, missed the playoff by a stroke; defending champion Stacy Lewis finished two strokes back, in a tie for fourth.

Field
The field was 117 players, including 110 professionals and seven amateurs. The 36-hole cut was the top 70 players and ties; it was at 148 (+4) and 82 players advanced to the weekend.

Past champions in the field

Made the cut

Missed the cut

Source:

Tournament summary

First round
Thursday, March 29, 2012

Amy Yang shot a six-under 66 to claim the lead after the first round on Friday. Lindsey Wright shot 67 for second place and world number one and 2010 winner Yani Tseng shot four-under 68 for third place. Defending champion Stacy Lewis was tied for sixtieth at 74 (+2).

Source:

Second round
Friday, March 30, 2012

Yani Tseng moved into first place after 36 holes with another 68 and Haeji Kang was one stroke back. The biggest movers into the top five were Karin Sjödin and Na Yeon Choi; both shot 67 and moved into a tie for fifth. The cut was at 148 (+4) and 82 players advanced.

Source:
Amateurs: Jutanugarn (E), Ernst (+3), Hull (+4), Lee (+11).

Third round
Saturday, March 31, 2012

Source:

Final round
Sunday, April 1, 2012

Source:

Amateurs: Jutanugarn (−2), Hull (+1), Ernst (+4).

Scorecard
Final round

Cumulative tournament scores, relative to par

Source:

Playoff
The sudden-death playoff began on the par-5 18th hole; Yoo birdied to win the title.

Source:

References

External links

Chevron Championship
Golf in California
Kraft Nabisco Championship
Kraft Nabisco Championship
Kraft Nabisco Championship
Kraft Nabisco Championship
Kraft Nabisco Championship